Katja Brandner is a fictional character on German daytime soap opera Verbotene Liebe (Forbidden Love). The character was portrayed by actress Diana Frank from January 15, 2008 to January 5, 2009.

Character's background
After a family visiting in Flensburg, Arno (Konrad Krauss) takes his cousin Matthias (Thomas Ohrner) and his wife Katja with him, to stay with him for a little bit in Düsseldorf. Katja enjoys the new town and wishes herself to live here with her family. In the first place, Matthias isn't into her plan, but after their daughter Lydia (Theresa Underberg) gets a job in Düsseldorf, Matthias reconsiders the idea. Lydia and Katja can persuade Matthias and the family stays, along with their younger son Fabian (Shai Hoffmann), in Düsseldorf.  At the "Goodbye"-party for Leonard von Lahnstein (Lars Korten) and his wife Jana (Vanessa Jung), who is Arno's niece, Elisabeth von Lahnstein (Martina Servatius) offers Katja a job as cook.

Her marriage impends to fall apart, when she had a one-night stand with Sebastian von Lahnstein (Joscha Kiefer), her daughter's boyfriend. After they slept together, Sebastian and Katja only want forget about what happened and move on with their life's. But Sebastian talks to Katja that he can't lie any longer to Lydia and that she needs to know. Several times, Sebastian is short before to tell her everything, but refuses always in the last moment. Katja and Sebastian come to the end, that it's for the best, when Lydia doesn't know about their night. 
But then, Katja gets sick and has the deep feeling that she might be pregnant. When she takes a test, Katja finds herself in a bad position. She is pregnant! And the child could be from Sebastian or her husband Matthias. Matthias, who already knows that she betrayed him, but doesn't now with whom, has a hard time dealing with it and is considering, if he might should just leave Katja and end their marriage. But his love for her is stronger and Matthias tells Katja to accept the child as his. 
Soon later, Sebastian discovers that Katja is pregnant and asks her if the baby could be his. Katja denies it, but Sebastian later finds out the truth, when Matthias tells Lydia and him, in which week Katja is pregnant. Sebastian is shocked and doesn't know what to do, if the child is really his. Sebastian wants to tell Lydia again, but refuses also again, because Katja makes him clear, that this would ruin everybody life. 
Sebastian and Katja then have an ongoing fight what is, if the child is really his. In this fight, Katja breaks down and Sebastian takes her to the doctor. That's the first time, Sebastian sees that little child on the ultrasonics. They also find out that Katja is expecting a baby girl. From this moment on, Sebastian wants to play a role in the life of this child, if she is his.

Sebastian takes an ultrasonics photo of the child, not imagining that this would be the clue that let his one-night stand with Katja expose. On a trip with the Brandner family, to celebrate Lydia's birthday, Matthias registers a fight between Katja and Sebastian and gets an unbelievable suspicion: Could Sebastian be the man, who slept with Katja? He later tells his son Fabian about this, who tells him that Katja would never do something like that to Lydia, her own daughter. But when Fabian later tells Judith (Katrin Heß) about this, she can't stay quiet any longer. She tells Fabian that Matthias' suspicion was right and that Katja begged her to tell nobody about that. Fabian is outraged and hits Sebastian later for sleeping with his mother. Lydia doesn't know what is going on, until Sebastian tells her that he slept with another woman once, when they had a huge fight. Before he can tell her that it was Katja, Lydia runs off, searching for comfort by her mother. When Sebastian later arrives at the Brandner house to finally tell Lydia the whole truth, Katja tells him that this will destroy her family once and for all. Then Lydia already walks in and wants to know what's going on. Sebastian then tells her, that the woman he slept with was Katja. After that, Fabian and Lydia don't want to have anything to do with Katja anymore and want her out of their lives. When Matthias comes back from a business trip, he walks in on another fight between Fabian, Lydia, and Katja where his wife tells him everything. Matthias can't believe what Katja has done, to her daughter, to their marriage, and their entire family. He can't forgive her and throws her out of the house with the announcement that he wants a divorce. When her son David (Sven Koller) returns from Australia, he tries to reunite his parents, but their decision seems final.

But in the end, Matthias can't stay away from her and sees that Katja is his great love and he never will get over her. He takes her back and wants to give her another chance, which Lydia doesn't understand and fears to lose her father. But with time, Lydia begins to miss Katja too. Matthias hopes that he sooner or later can reunite his family. When Lydia helps Katja to give birth to her daughter Christina, the two finally reconcile. Matthias first doesn't know how to deal with Christina, still not knowing if she really is his daughter, but after a moment of soul searching he accepts Christina as his daughter. Together with David, Lydia, and Christina, Matthias and Katja celebrate Christmas, before Katja starts to feel sick. Matthias is worried and wants her to see a doctor, but she won't listen. A short time later, Lydia promises her mother she will take care of the family before Katja dies in Matthias' arms.

References

Brandner, Katja
Brandner, Katja
Television characters introduced in 2008